Mehdiabad (also Romanized as Mehdīābād; also known as Mehdi Abad Rastagh) is a village in Rostaq Rural District, in the Central District of Saduq County, Yazd Province, Iran. At the 2006 census, its population was 160, in 42 families.

References 

Populated places in Saduq County